Deberitz is a surname. Notable people with the surname include:

Jan Deberitz (1950–2014), Norwegian novelist;
Per Deberitz (1880–1945), Norwegian painter.